Zev Wolf of Zhitomyr (died 1798) was a Hassidic Rabbi. He studied under, and has been styled as a disciple of, Dov Ber of Mezeritch, also known as the "Maggid of Mesritch".

Works
 Or HaMeir. Chassidut in the order of the weekly Torah portions and the festivals. Poritsk, 1815.

See also
Zev Wolf (disambiguation page)

Notes

References

1798 deaths
Year of birth missing
People from Zhytomyr